Jordi Tixier (born 2 November 1991) is a French professional motocross rider.

References

External links
 Jordi Tixier at MXGP web site
 
 

Living people
1991 births
French motocross riders